Without Meyer, No Celebration is Complete (German: Keine Feier ohne Meyer) is a 1931 German comedy film directed by Carl Boese and starring Sig Arno, Ralph Arthur Roberts and Dina Gralla. Boese made a number of films featuring Jewish comedians during the Weimar Era.

Synopsis
Meyer, an ambitious young Jewish man, tries to pass himself off as a successful business tycoon in order to marry into an upper-class family. He has impressed the girl's father of his suitability but the daughter shows her reluctance to marrying him because she is in love with another man named Walter. Meyer mistakenly advises Walter to elope with his secret girlfriend, without realising he is sabotaging his own dream of marrying her. In the end Meyer happily settles down with his secretary who has always loved him.

Cast
 Sig Arno as Sigmund Meyer 
 Ralph Arthur Roberts as Town Councilman Goebel  
 Dina Gralla as Elsa Goebel 
 Adele Sandrock as Mother Goebel 
 Maly Delschaft as Miss Krauss 
 Lucie Englisch as Steno 
 Kurt Vespermann as Walter, Elsa's Fiancé 
 Gaston Briese as Widower 
 Herbert Kiper as Unhappy Husband 
 Käte Lenz as Unhappy Wife 
 Gerhard Dammann as A Director 
 Eugen Neufeld as A Director 
 Siegfried Berisch as Husband 
 Else Reval as Wife 
 Hermann Krehan as Registrar
 Albert Karchow   
 Ernst Behmer   
 Karl Harbacher

References

Bibliography
 Prawer, S.S. Between Two Worlds: The Jewish Presence in German and Austrian Film, 1910-1933. Berghahn Books, 2005.

External links

1931 films
1931 comedy films
German comedy films
Films of the Weimar Republic
1930s German-language films
Films directed by Carl Boese
German black-and-white films
1930s German films